Kissi Agyebeng is a Ghanaian lawyer, academic and the Special Prosecutor of Ghana as of 2021. Prior to his appointment, he was a lecturer at the University of Ghana and the chairman of the Electronic Communications Tribunal of Ghana.

Early life and education (1978-2006)
Agyebeng was born on 2 July 1978, and hails from Kwahu Nkwatia, in the Eastern Region. He attended the Accra Academy where  he obtained his Ordinary Level (O-Level) certificate in 1994 and his Advanced Level (A-Level) certificate in 1996. Following his secondary education, he gained admission to study Law at the University of Ghana, where he graduated in 2001 as the best graduating student of his batch, winning the Bentsi-Enchill Award for Best Graduating Law Student. Agyebeng continued at the Ghana School of Law in 2001, and graduated in 2003 with the E.N. Sowah Memorial Award for Best Student in Family Law. That same year, he was called to the Ghana Bar. In 2004 he enrolled at the Schulich School of Law, University of Dallhousie, where he studied Marine and Environmental Law, graduating in 2005. Following his postgraduate studies at Dallhousie, he entered Cornell Law School, Cornell University, for another master's degree program in Corporate Law and Securities Regulation. At Cornell, he was the editor of the Cornell LL.M. Newsletter.

Early Career (2006-2021)

Academia 
Following his post graduate studies abroad, Agyebeng returned to Ghana where he gained employment as a lecturer at the University of Ghana. In 2009, he doubled as the International Humanitarian Law lecturer at the Regional Maritime University in Nungua, Accra. In 2011 he joined the Ghana Armed Forces Staff College, and a year later, taught Criminal Law at Mountcrest University College. In 2013 and 2014, he taught Criminal Law at Central University College, and the Ghana Institute of Management and Public Administration (GIMPA) respectively. He remained a lecturer at the University of Ghana until his appointment as the Special Prosecutor in 2021.

Legal practice 
Agyebeng begun as an associate at Zoe, Akyea and Co. Law firm. He joined the Center for Public Interest Law (CEPIL), a Human Rights/Public Interest Law Firm in Accra in 2008, and a year later, gained employment at the Accra based Ayine and Felli Law Firm as a Senior Associate. Prior to his appointment to the office of the Special Prosecutor, he was a Managing Partner of Cromwell Gray LLP, and the chairman of the Electronic Communications Tribunal of Ghana; a tribunal responsible for the adjudication of appeals from verdicts of the National Communications Authority (NCA) and the Dispute Resolution Committee of the NCA, with regards to the use of electronic communications, how broadcasting is regulated, and the utilization of the electro-magnetic spectrum, in addition to other related issues. He was made chairman of the tribunal on 1 July 2019, succeeding Samuel Date-Bah, formerly Justice of the Supreme Court of Ghana.

Special Prosecutor (2021- present)

Nomination and Appointment as Special Prosecutor 
Agyebeng was nominated on 26 April 2021 by the Attorney General, Godfred Yeboah Dame, to replace Martin Amidu, the former Special Prosecutor who resigned on 16 November 2020. The nomination was with accordance to section 13(8) of the Special Prosecutor Act 2017 (Act 959) that states that; "When the position of the Special Prosecutor becomes vacant, the president shall, within six months, appoint another qualified person for that portfolio". In a letter to the office of the president, the Attorney General stated that; "Kissi Agyebeng possesses the requisite expertise on corruption and corruption-related matters, is of high moral character and proven integrity and satisfies all the other requirements stipulated in section 13(1) and (2) of Act 959". The nomination was then approved by the president and forwarded to parliament. He was vetted by the Appointments Committee of parliament on Thursday 22 July 2021, and unanimously recommended. He was subsequently approved unanimously by parliament on Friday 30 July 2021. As stated by the first deputy speaker of parliament, Joseph Osei Owusu; "The motion is adopted, Kissi Agyebeng has been confirmed as a nominee for the position of Special Prosecutor". Agyabeng was sworn into office by the president of Ghana, Nana Akufo-Addo on Thursday 5 August 2021. According to the president; "He has the capacity, the experience, the requisite values and intellectual strength to succeed in this vital position".

Agyebeng and salary 
In September 2021, Agyebeng had said he quit his teaching job at the University of Ghana for private legal practice because of poor salary paid lecturers of the university. Agyebeng added that he would have stayed on to teach at the university if lecturers at the university were paid well. Agyebeng taught at the University for Ghana for fifteen yeers; from 2006 to 2021. This retrospective comments were made whilst he was a guest in the capacity of Special Prosecutor on a Ghanaian radio interview.

In December 2022, Agyebeng spoke to pressmen to protest non-payment of salary for himself and staff he had engaged for work at the Office of the Special Prosecutor for a period of 16 months. His predecessor, Martin Amidu by a rejoinder action, responded to Agyebeng's salary comments after Agyebeng had referenced salary arrears owed Amidu to garner public support. Amidu claimed that Agyebeng did not follow procedure in engaging staff at the office saying Agyebeng made "unlawful and unconstitutional appointments". Amidu's reason was that "valid warrants of appointments" were not given as the recruitments were done without the involvement of the governing board of the OSP and the Public Service Commission. Amidu also revealed that Agyebeng was seeking "a higher personalised salary" for which he has not been paid. 
    
In January 2023, pressmen later picked up that Agyebeng had refused to take up the recommended salary of GHç20,000 because he deemed it as "not befit of [his] status". Agyebeng is said to have been told by government that he would be paid what is approved by the Public Service Commission and not necessarily what befits his status. The government has also asked that anomalies from Agyebeng's various appointments be rectified.

Work as Special Prosecutor 
On December 9, 2021, it was reported he delivered a speech on the World Anti-Corruption Day.  
 
On 4th January 2023, Agyebeng's office released a half year report detailing 120 investigations being carried out by Agyebeng. Of these investigations, 2 had led to ongoing prosecution before law courts and another 2 of these investigations had been completed and awaiting to be acted upon.

Selected publications 

 Theory in Search of Practice – The Right of Innocent Passage in the Territorial Sea, Cornell International Law Journal, (2006) p 371.

 The Prophecies of the Prophetic Jurist – A Review of Selected Works of Oliver Wendell Holmes, Jr. (2005). Cornell Law School LL.M. Papers Series. Paper10.

 Disappearing Acts – Toward a Global Civil Liability Regime for Pollution Damage Resulting from Offshore Oil and Gas Exploration (2006). Cornell Law School LL.M. Papers Series. Paper 11

 Minority Rights in Corporate Governance in Ghana: The End of the Rule in Foss v. Harbottle?, in Ghana Law Since Independence: History, Development and Prospects, Mensa-Bonsu et al eds, 73 (Black Mask Ltd, 2007)

 To Disclose or Not to Disclose the Offence – That is the Question: The Case of Allan William Hodgson (2008-2010) 24 University of Ghana Law Journal 87

 A Commitment to Law, Development & Public Policy – A Festschrift in Honour of Nana Dr. SKB Asante (Wildy, Simmonds & Hill Publishing, London, 2016) – co-editor with Richard Frimpong Oppong

 Conflict of Laws in Ghana (Sedco Publishing, Accra, (upcoming February 2021) – co-author with Richard Frimpong Oppong

Personal life 
Agyebeng is a Christian and married.

See also
 Office of the Special Prosecutor
 List of Akufo-Addo government ministers and political appointees

References 

1978 births
Alumni of the Accra Academy
Cornell University alumni
Cornell Law School alumni
Dalhousie University alumni
Schulich School of Law alumni
21st-century Ghanaian lawyers
University of Ghana alumni
Living people
Ghana School of Law alumni
Academic staff of the University of Ghana